Carolyn Strauss (born July 13, 1963) is an American television executive and producer. She was the president of the Home Box Office network's entertainment division until 2008 and was responsible for commissioning series like The Sopranos, The Wire, Six Feet Under, Curb Your Enthusiasm and Sex and the City. Upon leaving the position she became a television developer and producer and was given a production deal with HBO. She has collaborated with the network on the series Treme, Game of Thrones and Luck.

Personal life
Being of Jewish descent, in August 2015 she signed - as one of 98 members of the Los Angeles Jewish community - an open letter supporting the proposed nuclear agreement between Iran and six world powers led by the United States "as being in the best interest of the United States and Israel."

Filmography
 Treme (2010–2013) – Executive Producer
 Game of Thrones – (2011–2019) Executive Producer
 Luck (2011–2012) – Executive Producer
 The Specials (2014) – Executive Producer
 Chernobyl (2019) – Executive Producer
 Deadwood: The Movie (2019) – Executive Producer
The Baby (2022) – Executive Producer
The Last of Us (2023) – Executive Producer

References

External links

 

Television producers from New York (state)
American women television producers
American television executives
Women television executives
20th-century American Jews
Living people
People from Scarsdale, New York
Scarsdale High School alumni
1963 births
Harvard College alumni
21st-century American Jews
20th-century American women
21st-century American women
Jewish American television producers